The World Para Athletics Championships, known as the IPC Athletics World Championships prior to 2017, are a biennial Paralympic athletics event organized by World Para Athletics, a subcommittee of the International Paralympic Committee (IPC). It features athletics events contested by athletes with physical and intellectual disabilities. The first IPC Athletics World Championships were held in Berlin, Germany in 1994.

They are a Paralympic parallel to the World Athletics Championships for able-bodied athletes. Since 2011, when they switched from a quadrennial scheduling to biennial, the IPC championships have been held in the same years as the IAAF championships, although they are separate events and are not necessarily held in the same host city. In 2017, London, which previously hosted the 2012 Summer Paralympics, became the first city to host both the IAAF World Championships and World Para Athletics Championships in the same year and as connected events.

Championships

 https://web.archive.org/web/20210826201001/http://www.jobosport.nl/userfiles/documents/28.pdf - 1994 Results Book
 https://web.archive.org/web/20210826201316/http://www.jobosport.nl/userfiles/documents/35.pdf - 2002 Results Book

Medal table 
Medals counted from 1994 to 2019. 1998 results are currently unknown.

Classification
F = field athletes
T = track athletes
P = pentathlon
11-13 – visually impaired, 11 and 12 compete with a sighted guide
20 – intellectual disability
31-38 – cerebral palsy or other conditions that affect muscle co-ordination and control. Athletes in class 31-34 compete in a seated position; athletes in class 35-38 compete standing.
40-46 – amputation, les autre
51-58 – wheelchair athletes
 61-64: Athletes who have a prosthesis affected by limb deficiency and leg length difference.

See also
 World Juniors Para Athletics Championships
 European Para Athletics Championships
 Asian Para Athletics Championships
 World Athletics Championships
 Athletics at the Paralympics

References

External links
New Athletics World Records Set in Lille, International Paralympic Committee (IPC), 25 July 2002
III ATHLETICS WORLD CHAMPIONSHIPS - I.P.C 2002 - program & Results (archived, Wayback Machine)
US Captures 11 Gold Medals in IPC World Championships, The O&P EDGE, October 2002
2006 IPC World Championships In Athletics - Selection Criteria, Athletics Canada
Dr. Detlef Eckert startet bei der Leichtathletik-WM der Behinderten gleich dreimal (German), Berliner Zeitung, July 22, 1994
Vom Rehabilitationssport zu den Paralympics (German), Sportmuseum Leipzig
More victories for disabled athletes, Mail & Guardian Online, Aug 17 1998
More gold for disabled athletes, Mail & Guardian Online, Aug 14 1998
Alexander Stadium, newman.ac.uk
Maxxyz Controlled Martin Lighting Package for IPC Athletics World Championships, livetime.nl, November 7, 2006
IPC Athletics

 
Parasports world championships
Paraathletics
Para-athletics competitions
Recurring sporting events established in 1994
Biennial athletics competitions